Edward Charles Francis Publius de Bono (19 May 1933 – 9 June 2021) was a Maltese physician, psychologist, author, inventor and broadcaster. He originated the term lateral thinking, wrote many books on thinking including Six Thinking Hats, and was a proponent of the teaching of thinking as a subject in schools.

Life and career 
Edward Charles Francis Publius de Bono was born in Malta on 19 May 1933. Educated at St. Edward's College, Malta, he then gained a medical degree from the University of Malta. Following this, he proceeded as a Rhodes Scholar in 1955 to Christ Church, Oxford, where he gained an MA in psychology and physiology. He represented Oxford in polo and set two canoeing records. He then gained a PhD degree in medicine from Trinity College, Cambridge, an honorary DDes (Doctor of Design) from the Royal Melbourne Institute of Technology, and an honorary LLD from the University of Dundee.

De Bono held faculty appointments at the universities of Oxford, Cambridge (where he helped to establish the university's medical school), London and Harvard. He was a professor at the University of Malta, the University of Pretoria, the University of Central England (now called Birmingham City University) and Dublin City University. De Bono held the Da Vinci Professor of Thinking chair at the University of Advancing Technology in Tempe, Arizona, US. He was one of the 27 Ambassadors for the European Year of Creativity and Innovation 2009.

The originator of the term 'Lateral Thinking', de Bono wrote 85 books with translations into 46 languages. He taught his thinking methods to government agencies, corporate clients, organizations and individuals, privately or publicly in group sessions. He promoted the World Center for New Thinking (2004–2011), based in Malta, which applied Thinking Tools to solution and policy design on the geopolitical level.

In 1976, de Bono took part in a radio debate for the BBC with British philosopher A. J. Ayer, on the subject of effective democracy.

Starting on Wednesday 8 September 1982, the BBC ran a series of 10 weekly programmes entitled de Bono's Thinking Course. In the shows, Dr Edward de Bono explained how thinking skills could be improved by attention and practice. The series was repeated the following year. A book with the same title accompanied the series.

In May 1994, he gave a half-hour Opinions lecture televised on Channel 4 and subsequently published in The Independent as "Thinking Hats On".

In 1995, he created a futuristic documentary film, 2040: Possibilities by Edward de Bono, depicting a lecture to an audience of viewers released from a cryogenic freeze for contemporary society in the year 2040.

In 2005, he was nominated (and reached the shortlist) for the Nobel Prize in Economics.

Schools from over 20 countries have included de Bono's thinking tools into their curriculum, and he has advised and lectured at the board level at many of the world's leading corporations.

Convinced that a key way forward for humanity is a better language, he published The Edward de Bono Code Book in 2000. In this book, he proposed a suite of new words based on numbers, where each number combination represents a useful idea or situation that currently does not have a single-word representation. For example, de Bono code 6/2 means "Give me my point of view and I will give you your point of view." Such a code might be used in situations where one or both of the two parties in a dispute are making insufficient effort to understand the other's perspective.

Asteroid 2541 Edebono discovered by Luboš Kohoutek is named after him.

Personal life 
In 1971 he married Josephine Hall-White. They had two sons, Caspar and Charlie, and later divorced. His will, published after his death, named two more children, another son, Edward Szekely, also known as Edward de Bono, the son of Magdalena Szekely, and a daughter, Juliana Pars.

Other ideas 
De Bono invented the L game, which he introduced in his book The Five-Day Course in Thinking.

In 2000, de Bono advised a UK Foreign Office committee that the Arab–Israeli conflict might be due, in part, to low levels of zinc found in people who eat unleavened bread (e.g. pita flatbread). De Bono argued that low zinc levels leads to heightened aggression. He suggested shipping out jars of Marmite to compensate.

Edward de Bono argued that companies could raise money just as governments now do – by printing it. He put forward the idea of private currency as a claim on products or services produced by the issuer. So IBM might issue "IBM Dollars" – theoretically redeemable for IBM equipment, but also practically tradable for other vouchers or cash. To make such a scheme work, IBM would have to learn to manage the supply of money to ensure that—with too many vouchers chasing too few goods—inflation does not destroy the value of their creations. But companies should be able to manage that trick at least as easily as governments do, particularly as they don't have voters to cope with.

Critiques 
The following three published critiques of de Bono's work emphasize the lack of evidence to support his proposals.

In the Handbook of Creativity, Robert J. Sternberg writes, Equally damaging to the scientific study of creativity, in our view, has been the takeover of the field, in the popular mind, by those who follow what might be referred to as a pragmatic approach. Those taking this approach have been concerned primarily with developing creativity, secondarily with understanding it, but almost not at all with testing the validity of their ideas about it. [...] Perhaps the foremost proponent of this approach is Edward De Bono, whose work on lateral thinking and other aspects of creativity has had what appears to be considerable commercial success.

Frameworks For Thinking is an evaluation of 42 popular thinking frameworks conducted by a team of researchers. Regarding Edward de Bono they write, [he] is more interested in the usefulness of developing ideas than proving the reliability or efficacy of his approach. There is sparse research evidence to show that generalised improvements in thinking performance can be attributed to training in the use of CoRT [Cognitive Research Trust] or Thinking Hats tools. An early evaluation of CoRT reported significant benefits for Special Educational Needs (SEN) pupils... However, in a more recent study with Australian aboriginal children (Ritchie and Edwards, 1996), little evidence of generalisation was found other than in the area of creative thinking.

Summarising de Bono's 1985 work in Conflicts: A Better Way to Resolve Them, M. Afzalur Rahim, distinguished professor of management at Western Kentucky University with a particular focus on conflict management in organizations, gives his view that, as pertains to Rahim's own field of research, "De Bono's approach to total elimination of conflict is no different from the approaches of the classicists. This approach to dealing with conflict is completely out of tune with modern thinking and, therefore, unsatisfactory."

Published works 

A partial list of books by de Bono includes:
 The Use of Lateral Thinking (1967) , introduced the term "lateral thinking"
 New Think (1967, 1968) 
 The Five-Day Course in Thinking (1968), introduced the L game
 The Mechanism of Mind (1969), Intl Center for Creative Thinking 1992 reprint: 
 Lateral Thinking: Creativity Step by Step, (1970), Harper & Row 1973 paperback: 
 The Dog-Exercising Machine (1970)
 Technology Today (1971)
 Practical Thinking (1971)
 Lateral Thinking for Management (1971)
 Po: A Device for Successful Thinking (1972), introduced the term Po
 Children Solve Problems (1972) ,  (1974 reprint)
 Po: Beyond Yes and No (1973), 
 Eureka!: An Illustrated History of Inventions from the Wheel to the Computer (1974)
 Teaching Thinking (1976)
 The Greatest Thinkers: The Thirty Minds That Shaped Our Civilization (1976), 
 Wordpower: An Illustrated Dictionary of Vital Words (1977)
 The Happiness Purpose (1977)
 Opportunities: A handbook for business opportunity search (1978)
 Future Positive (1979)
 Atlas of Management Thinking (1981)
 De Bono's Thinking Course (1982)
 Learn-To-Think: Coursebook and Instructors Manual with Michael Hewitt-Gleeson de Saint-Arnaud (1982), 
 Tactics: The Art and Science of Success (1985)
 Conflicts: A Better Way to Resolve them (1985)
 Masterthinker's Handbook (1985)
 Six Thinking Hats (1985) 
 I Am Right, You Are Wrong: From This to the New Renaissance: From Rock Logic to Water Logic (1968) 
 Six Action Shoes (1991)
 Handbook for the Positive Revolution (1991) 
 Serious Creativity: Using the Power of Lateral Thinking to Create New Ideas (1992)  – a summation of many of De Bono's ideas on creativity
 Sur/Petition (1992) 
 Water Logic: The Alternative to I am Right You are Wrong (1993) 
 Parallel thinking: from Socratic thinking to de Bono thinking (1994) 
 Teach Yourself How to Think (1995)
 Textbook of Wisdom (1996) 
 How to Be More Interesting (1998)
 Simplicity (1999)
 New Thinking for the New Millennium (1999)
 Why I Want To Be King of Australia (1999)
 The De Bono Code Book (2000) 
 How to Have A Beautiful Mind (2004)
 Six Value Medals (2005) 
 H+ (Plus): A New Religion (2006) 
 How to Have Creative Ideas (2007) 
 Free or Unfree? : Are Americans Really Free? (2007) 
 Intelligence, Information, Thinking (2007) 
 Six Frames For Thinking About Information (2008) 
 The Love of Two Cockroaches (2009) 
 Think! Before It's Too Late (2009) 
 Lateral Thinking – An Introduction (2014) 
 Bonting – Thinking to Create Value (2016) 
De Bono also wrote numerous articles published in refereed and other journals, including The Lancet and Clinical Science.

See also 
 Lateral thinking
 Parallel thinking
 Six Thinking Hats

References

Further reading 
 Piers Dudgeon: Breaking Out of the Box: The Biography of Edward de Bono. London: Headline, 2001.

External links 

 

1933 births
2021 deaths
20th-century Maltese philosophers
Maltese Rhodes Scholars
Maltese psychologists
Popular psychology
20th-century Maltese physicians
Alumni of Christ Church, Oxford
Alumni of Trinity College, Cambridge
University of Malta alumni
Academics of the University of Cambridge
Academic staff of the University of Pretoria
Creativity researchers
21st-century Maltese philosophers